MV Eilean Dhiura is a vehicle ferry operating across the Sound of Islay.

History
Eilean Dhiura was commissioned by Argyll and Bute Council in 1998, to replace Western Ferries  as the Jura Ferry. She was operated initially by Serco Denholm until 2003, now by ASP Ship Management Ltd.

In December 2000, her bow ramp collapsed while at sea. Following this, the MCA required a secondary door to be fitted behind the bow door. A bid by the council for money to replace her was unsuccessful. A new bow ramp was fitted in 2002.

Layout
Eilean Dhiura is an open landing craft type ferry, with bow and stern ramps. Her slim bridge allows vehicles to drive through. A small enclosed cabin provides shelter for passengers as does a bus shelter forward of the wheelhouse.

Service
Eilean Dhiura is the Feolin Ferry, providing the main access to Jura. Islay is connected to the Scottish mainland by a Caledonian MacBrayne ferry from Kennacraig. During her overhaul, early in the year, the service is provided by a chartered vessel, commonly CalMac's  or since 2007  belonging to Inverlussa Shellfish Ltd of Mull or more recently the Spanish John II.

References

External links
Council ferry website

Ferries of Scotland
1998 ships
Jura, Scotland